Amblyseius caudatus is a species of mite in the family Phytoseiidae.

References

caudatus
Articles created by Qbugbot
Animals described in 1914